The 2022 Houston Cougars football team represented the University of Houston in the 2022 NCAA Division I FBS football season. The Cougars played their home games at TDECU Stadium in Houston, Texas, competing in the American Athletic Conference (The American). They were led by 4th-year head coach Dana Holgorsen. In September 2021, Houston and fellow conference members Cincinnati and UCF accepted bids to join the Big 12 Conference. The schools had been contractually required to remain with The American through 2024, but all reached a separation agreement that allowed them to join the Big 12 in 2023. Accordingly, the 2022 season was the program's last season as a member of The American.

Previous season

The Cougars finished the 2021 season with a 12–2 (8–0 AAC) record to finish tied for first in the conference. They would lose the AAC Championship Game to Cincinnati. It was their first appearance in the conference championship game since 2015. They won the Birmingham Bowl 17–13 against Auburn.

Preseason

Award watch lists
Listed in the order that they were released

American Athletic Conference preseason media poll
The American Athletic Conference preseason media poll was released at AAC Media Day on July 28, 2022. The Cougars were picked to win the conference, edging defending conference champion Cincinnati by one vote.

Schedule

Schedule Source:

Game summaries

at UTSA

at Texas Tech

Kansas

Rice (Bayou Bucket Classic)

Tulane

at Memphis

at Navy

South Florida

at SMU

Temple

at East Carolina

Tulsa

vs. Louisiana (Independence Bowl)

Awards and milestones

Rankings

References

Houston
Houston Cougars football seasons
Independence Bowl champion seasons
Houston Cougars football